This article charts results of the group stage of the 2006–07 UEFA Cup.

Tie-breaking criteria
Based on paragraph 6.06 in the UEFA regulations for the current season, if two or more teams are equal on points on completion of the group matches, the following criteria are applied to determine the rankings:
superior goal difference from all group matches played;
higher number of goals scored;
higher number of goals scored away;
higher number of wins;
higher number of away wins;
higher number of coefficient points accumulated by the club in question, as well as its association, over the previous five seasons.

Groups

Group A

All times CET

Notes
Note 1: Maccabi Haifa played their home matches at Bloomfield Stadium in Tel Aviv instead of their regular stadium, Kiryat Eliezer Stadium, Haifa.

Group B

All times CET

Group C

All times CET

Group D

All times CET

Group E

All times CET

Group F

All times CET

Group G

All times CET

Notes
Note 2: Spectrators not allowed because of riots on previous Panathinaikos home game.

Group H

All times CET

References

Group Stage
2006-07